The 2022 Cazoo UK Open was a darts tournament staged by the Professional Darts Corporation. It was the twentieth year of the tournament where players compete in a single elimination tournament to be crowned champion. The tournament returned to Butlin's Minehead, England, between 4–6 March 2022, having been held behind closed doors at the Marshall Arena, Milton Keynes in 2021 owing to the COVID-19 pandemic.

James Wade was the defending champion after defeating Luke Humphries 11–5 in the 2021 final, but he lost 10–4 to Keane Barry in the quarter-finals.

Danny Noppert won his first PDC major tournament, beating Michael Smith 11–10 in the final after Smith had a dart for the title. Noppert's average of 84.82 was the lowest winning average in a straight start format in a PDC major, and the second-lowest winning average overall ahead of Alan Warriner-Little's 83.25 in the 2001 World Grand Prix.

The tournament saw three nine-dart finishes. José Justicia hit the first in his third round game against Adam Gawlas. Defending champion James Wade also hit one during his sixth round game against Boris Krčmar. Michael Smith hit another in his own sixth round game against Mensur Suljović.

Format
The 160 participants entered the competition incrementally, with 64 players entering in the first round, with match winners joining the 32 players entering in the second and third rounds to leave the last 64 in the fourth round.

No players are seeded.
A random draw is held for each of the following rounds following the conclusion of the third round.
All matches in the first, second and third rounds will be played over best of 11 legs.
All matches in the fourth, fifth and sixth rounds and quarter-finals will be played over best of 19 legs.
All matches in the semi-finals and final will be played over best of 21 legs.
Eight boards will be used for matches in the first, second, third and fourth rounds.
Four boards will be used for matches in the fifth round.
Two boards will be used for matches in the sixth round.
One board will be used for all the matches in the quarter-finals, semi-finals and final.

Prize money
The prize fund remained at £450,000.

Qualification
The 128 Tour Card holders had a staggered entry based on their world ranking on 28 February 2022. They were joined by the top 4 players from each of the 2021 UK & European Challenge & Development Tour Orders of Merit, and by the winners of 16 Amateur Qualification events organised through Rileys Sports Bars.

Number 1–32 of the PDC Order of Merit (receiving byes into fourth round)

Number 33–64 of the PDC Order of Merit (receiving byes into third round)

Number 65–96 of the PDC Order of Merit (receiving byes into second round)

Number 97–128 of the PDC Order of Merit (starting in first round)

PDC UK Development Tour qualifiers (starting in first round)
The top 4 ranked players from the 2021 UK Development Tour Order of Merit who didn't have a Tour Card for the 2022 season qualified for the first round.

PDC European Development Tour qualifiers (starting in first round)
The top 4 ranked players from the 2021 European Development Tour Order of Merit who didn't have a Tour Card for the 2022 season qualified for the first round.

PDC UK Challenge Tour qualifiers (starting in first round)
The top 4 ranked players from the 2021 UK Challenge Tour Order of Merit who didn't have a Tour Card for the 2022 season qualified for the first round.

PDC European Challenge Tour qualifiers (starting in first round)
The top 4 ranked players from the 2021 European Challenge Tour Order of Merit who didn't have a Tour Card for the 2022 season qualified for the first round. Steven Noster chose not to compete and was replaced in the rankings by Lukas Wenig.

Riley's qualifiers (starting in first round)
The winners of qualifiers organised by Rileys Sports Bars, held through January and February 2022, qualified for the first round. Entry to these tournaments was open to all players who had not qualified via another method, regardless of PDC Membership status.

Draw

Friday 4 March

First round (best of eleven legs)

Second round (best of eleven legs)

Third round (best of eleven legs)

Fourth round (best of nineteen legs)

Saturday 5 March

Fifth round (best of nineteen legs)

Sixth round (best of nineteen legs)

Sunday 6 March

Quarter-finals (best of nineteen legs)

Semi-finals and Final

References

UK Open
UK Open
UK Open
UK Open